Adjamé is one of the 10 urban communes of Abidjan, Ivory Coast. It forms part of the metropolitan area and autonomous district of Abidjan.

The name Adjamé means "a junction" or "the centre" in the local Tchaman language. The Tchaman people of Adjamé are called Agbou Djemian and come under Chief Nanguy Abrogoua. Adjamé is located to the north of Plateau, Abidjan. Adjamé has the most important bus station in the country from where buses serve all of Ivory Coast as well as neighbouring countries.

Sport
Adjamé is represented in football by the Stella Club of Adjamé which plays in the MTN Ligue 1 on the grounds of the Municipal Stadium. As in most parts of Ivory Coast, the club is organised in an informal way with football teams of seven players. The players are called Maracanas. Another club is AS Athlétic d'Adjamé.

Basile Boli, the French footballer (45 caps, one goal), was born in Adjamé.

Government

Images

Notes

External links
Official website, Mayor of Adjamé

Communes of Abidjan